Guo Liang (Chinese: 郭亮; pinyin: Guō Liàng; born 20 March 1985 in Dalian, Liaoning) is a Chinese footballer who currently plays for Dalian Boyoung in the China League Two.

Club career
Guo started his professional football career in 2002 when he was promoted to Dalian Shide's first squad. He played as a substitute player for Adilson and made just 13 league appearances for Dalian between 2002 and 2005. He was loaned to China League One side Guangzhou Pharmaceutical in 2006. Guo transferred to another League One club Harbin Yiteng in December 2006 and left in June 2007. He moved to Chinese Super League club Qingdao Jonoon in January 2008.
On 5 January 2017, Guo transferred to Chinese Super League side Changchun Yatai.

In March 2018, Guo transferred to his hometown club Dalian Boyoung in the China League Two.

References

1985 births
Living people
Association football defenders
Chinese footballers
Footballers from Dalian
Dalian Shide F.C. players
Guangzhou F.C. players
Zhejiang Yiteng F.C. players
Qingdao Hainiu F.C. (1990) players
Changchun Yatai F.C.  players
Chinese Super League players
China League One players
21st-century Chinese people